Nikola Simić (18 May 1934 – 9 November 2014) was a Serbian actor and comedian, best known for his role as Mita Pantić in several films, most notably the 1982 Yugoslav film Tesna koža. He performed in more than 160 films beginning in 1957. He was the official voice dub for Bugs Bunny in the Serbian dub of Looney Tunes.

Selected filmography

References

External links

1934 births
2014 deaths
Serbian male film actors
Male actors from Belgrade
20th-century Serbian male actors
21st-century Serbian male actors